"Kiss Me" is a song recorded by English singer Olly Murs for Never Been Better: (Special Edition) (2015), the reissue of his fourth studio album, Never Been Better (2014). It was written by Taio Cruz, Murs, Zacharie Raymond, Yannick Rastogi, Steve Robson, Gary Derussy, Lindy Robbins, whilst the production was done by Banx & Ranx and Robson. It was digitally released on 9 October 2015, followed by a release of two remixes, an acoustic and a karaoke version of the song in a span of a month.

Production and release 

"Kiss Me" was written by Olly Murs, Zacharie Raymond, Yannick Rastogi, Steve Robson, Gary Derussy, Lindy Robbins and singer Taio Cruz, whilst the production was handled by Banx & Ranx (Raymond and Rastogi) and Robson. It was digitally released on 9 October 2015 as the first single from Never Been Better: Special Edition (2015), the reissue of his fourth studio album, Never Been Better (2014). A karaoke and an acoustic versions of the single were released via the iTunes Store on 30 October and 6 November respectively. Two remixes of "Kiss Me" were also launched; The Alias Club Mix was made available for download on 23 October, whilst the Aevion Tropical Mix was released on 13 November.

Composition 

"Kiss Me" is a song with a length of three minutes and eighteen seconds. Samantha Oneil of Renowned for Sound wrote that the song has a mid-tempo beat and a retro sound accompanied with "enticingly catchy lyrics". She described the composition of the single as a combination of Murs' "uplifting fast moving" past singles like "Troublemaker" and "Up" and "his emotionally powered ballads" like "Dear Darlin'". According to her, "The song manages to keep an authentic Olly Murs sound about it while also finding new ground." Idolator's Robbie Daw compared "Kiss Me" to the 2014 single by Nick Jonas, "Jealous".

Music video
The music video to "Kiss Me" was released on 15 October 2015. The video features Murs sitting in a chair in a dark room with a woman dancing around him and lap dancing on him. The video also shows Murs and the woman going on various dates such as the cinema, going to a restaurant, having a picnic, going on a roller coaster, lying in a hammock by a beach, meeting the woman's parents and having a hot air balloon ride. At the end of the video, Murs and the woman are sitting in deckchairs eating ice cream where it appears that the woman is about to kiss Murs, only to playfully stick her ice cream in his face to which Murs does the same to her with his ice cream.

Live performances
Murs has performed "Kiss Me" on the fourth live show of the twelfth series of The X Factor, Alan Carr: Chatty Man, Norwegian chat show Senkveld med Thomas og Harald, Sunday Brunch and the New Year's Eve special of TFI Friday.

Track listing and formats 

Digital download
"Kiss Me"  – 3:18

Digital remix
"Kiss Me (The Alias Club Mix)"  – 5:08

Digital download
"Kiss Me (Karaoke Mix)"  – 3:18

Digital download
"Kiss Me (Acoustic Mix)"  – 2:58

Digital remix
"Kiss Me (Aevion Tropical Mix)"  – 4:25

Credits and personnel 
Credits adapted from the liner notes of Never Been Better: Special Edition.

Olly Murs — songwriting
Steve Robson — songwriting, production
Taio Cruz — songwriting
Gary Derussy — songwriting, programming
Lindy Robbins — songwriting
Banx & Ranx — songwriting, production, engineering, programming
Ike Schultz — additional engineering
Peter Holz — additional engineering
Tom Coyne — mastering
Ash Howes — mixing

Charts

Certifications

Release history

References

External links 

Songs about kissing
2015 singles
2015 songs
Olly Murs songs
Song recordings produced by Steve Robson
Songs written by Olly Murs
Songs written by Steve Robson
Songs written by Taio Cruz